All American Handyman is a HGTV reality competition show between a group of handymen and women. The show is hosted Molly Culver, and judged by Mike Holmes and Scott McGillivray. It is a spin-off of Handyman Superstar Challenge, with similar challenges. A revamped Handyman Superstar Challenge is based on All American Handyman, called Canada's Handyman Challenge.

Series
All American Handyman is a competition between handymen and handywomen with challenges based on home repair and improvement, and basic woodworking. The winner of the competition is the "All American Handyman", and is offered a development deal with HGTV. After each challenge, a number of competitors are eliminated. There are two challenges per episode. The series is based on HGTV Canada's Handyman Superstar Challenge.

Season 1 (2010)

Top 10 Finalists 
 Peter Wong -- WINNER
 David "Dee" Pellot
 Dennis Nourry
 Elliot Boswell
 Flagg Youngblood
 Matthew McGuire
 Rich Homburger
 Sara Ashby
 Caitlin Oliveira
 Andrew Kowalyshyn

Contestant progress

Episodes

Episode 1: Hello Contestants, Goodbye Contestants
The twenty finalists are given two sheets of plywood to build anything they want within the time limit of two hours. Ten finalists make it the next stage, which includes the shape challenge and quizzes on building code and tools.

Episode 2: Teams of Two
The remaining eight contestants are paired into teams and given the task of finishing a section of a room. They must install a window, drywall, wainscot, trim, and wood flooring. To top it off, contestants have to install a flat screen TV on the wall.

After dropping two more contestants, the remaining six get one hour to install a salvaged door slab (including making the door frame) on a laundry room, as well as make a shelf above the washer and dryer.

Episode 3: Lay Out Kitchen Designs
Contestants are given one hour to incorporate a refrigerator, range, dishwasher, microwave and sink into a small, "L"-shaped kitchen. They must design and build the cabinets and install countertops as well.

After eliminating another handyman, the final four contestants face a trio of challenges, each to be completed in 30 minutes or less: repair a broken window pane; shingle a dog house; install a toilet.

Episode 4: This is the End My Friends
The final three contestants are given the task of designing and building an outdoor space including a deck, furniture, and a barbecue grill.

Season 2 (2011)
The second season is extended to have a total of 6 episodes, allowing the first to eliminate only 6 out of 20 instead of the first season's first episode where 12 out of 20 were eliminated.

Top 10 Finalists
 Allison Oropallo
 Andy Panko
 Cheryl Pokorny
 Jared Polston -- WINNER
 Kate Schorzman
 Lawrence Huffines
 Natalie Spahle
 Neil Smith
 Pete Kelley
 Shaun Killman

Contestant progress

Episodes

Episode 1: Make or Break
Initial findings, cutting down from 20 competitors to the top 14

Challenge 1: 
Use two sheets of plywood to build anything the contestant wants
Low: Howard, Marcus, Chris, Edward, Mike, Tonya
Eliminated: Edward Wurch, Mike Burns, Tonya Tyler

Challenge 2: 
Build a fence gate (no plans)
Low: Howard, Marcus, Chris, Josh, Andy
Eliminated: Chris Gill, Joshua Cohen, Marcus Bailey

Episode 2: Good on Paper
Challenge 1:
 Rough line drawing sketch of either Adirondack chair, planter box, or a small table
 Chair: Shaun, Kurt, Neil, Allison, Stefano
 Planter: Howard, Cheryl, Jared, Natalie
 Table: Matt, Pete, Andy, Kate, Lawrence
Eliminated: Matthew, Steffano

Challenge 2:
 Follow precise plans to build a toolbox
Eliminated: Kurt, Howard

Episode 3: Behind Closed Doors
Challenge 1:
 Each contestant is tested one-on-one by each judge
 Mike Holmes asks questions about building codes and general building knowledge, then has them attempt to find errors in a poorly built bathroom
 Scott McGillivray has them transfer shapes from one board to cut those shapes out of another board
 Guest judge Bill Kiss, CMO of Sears Tools, tests 'tool IQ' by having difficult situations where they must select the correct tool to use

Challenge 2:
 Build a staircase up to a 49 inch high platform

Episode 4: Terrible Twos
Challenge 1:
 Contestants are randomly divided into teams of two.  Each team must finish a room, starting from studs, they are asked to put in insulation, drywall, a window, hardwood flooring and trim, and mount a TV to the wall

The teams are:
 Shaun and Cheryl
 Allison and Andy
 Jared and Kate
 Lawrence and Neil
After the first challenge, the weakest team (Lawrence and Neil) compete one-on-one to install crown molding around a number of difficult corners

Challenge 2:
 Build a brick patio from the ground up

Episode 5: Know it or Blow it
Challenge 1:
 Obstacle course of 3 30 minute challenges that require prior knowledge to simply accomplish. Replacing a damaged piece of hardwood flooring, install an electrical socket and light with a switch on a wall, and build a small stack of bricks to test masonry knowledge.

Challenge 2:
 Install a double door, including frame, on a linen closet.  Then install a shelving system and fill it with linens.

Episode 6: To the Top
Challenge 1:
 Build a large garden shed in 6 hours, with the help of 2 crew who they must manage, having the night before to plan it.

Challenge 2:
 Layout and build a kitchen using random used kitchen cabinets and new appliances.

Season 3 (2012)

Top 10 Finalists
 Carol Webster
 Chris Leslie
 Christopher Topp
 Julia Crawford
 Michael West
 Paul Steiner
 Rodney Boyden
 Scott Clark
 Scott Heeres
 Sonne Shields -- WINNER

Episodes

Episode 1: Outhouse to the Doghouse
"Toilet Fixes and Custom Doghouse Build"
Challenge 1 Toilet replacement
Challenge 2 Custom doghouse build

Episode 2: Playground Battlefield
"Crying Babies and Playground Battles"
Challenge 1 Perform household fixes quietly without waking a sleeping baby
Challenge 2 Build custom playground

Episode 3: The Dream Garage
"From Clutter and Chaos to the Dream Garage"
Challenge 1 Window repair
Challenge 2 Teams of 2 to rebuild garage

Episode 4: Inspect and Garden
"Handymen Turned Home Inspectors Turned Garden Builders"
Challenge 1 Find home problems and repair them
Challenge 2 Build a tranquil garden retreat

Episode 5: Burnt by the BBQ
"The Crawlspace Obstacle Course and BBQ Island Build Off"
Challenge 1 Obstacle course
Challenge 2 Build a BBQ

Episode 6: Kitchen Crowns the Winner
"Media Room Redo and a Full Kitchen Build Out for the Win"
Challenge 1 Rebuild a media room
Challenge 2 Build a kitchen

References

External links
 
 

HGTV original programming
2010s American reality television series
English-language television shows
2010 American television series debuts
2013 American television series endings